Sylvie Bérubé is a Canadian politician serving as the Member of Parliament (MP) for Abitibi—Baie-James—Nunavik—Eeyou since 2019. A member of the Bloc Québécois (BQ), her riding encompasses more than half of Quebec, covering over 190 million acres in the northwest of the province. In the House of Commons, she serves as Vice-Chair of the Indigenous and Northern Affairs Committee.

Electoral history

References

External links

Bloc Québécois MPs
Women members of the House of Commons of Canada
21st-century Canadian politicians
21st-century Canadian women politicians
Living people
Members of the House of Commons of Canada from Quebec
Year of birth missing (living people)
People from Val-d'Or